The 2016 Singha Beer Grand Slam of Darts, was the tenth staging of the tournament, organised by the Professional Darts Corporation. The event took place from 12 to 20 November 2016 at the Wolverhampton Civic Hall, Wolverhampton, England.

The tournament's defending champion was Michael van Gerwen, who won the tournament in 2015 beating Phil Taylor in the final 16–13, and he retained his title by defeating James Wade 16–8 in the final.

Prize money

Qualifying

PDC Qualifying Tournaments

At most sixteen players could qualify through this method, where the position in the list depicts the priority of the qualification.

In case the list of qualifiers from the main tournaments produced fewer than sixteen players, the field of sixteen players is filled from the reserve lists. The first list consists of the winners from 2016 European Tour events, in which the winners shall be selected in ProTour Order of Merit position order at the cut-off date.

In case the list of qualifiers from the main tournaments and the European Tour produced fewer than sixteen players, the field of sixteen players is filled from the reserve lists. The second list consists of the winners from 2016 Players Championship events, in which the winners were selected in ProTour Order of Merit position order at the cut-off date.

PDC Qualifying Event
A further eight places in the Grand Slam of Darts were filled by qualifiers from a PDC qualifier in Barnsley on 23 October 2016.

 Robert Thornton
 Dimitri Van den Bergh
 Ted Evetts
 Brendan Dolan
 Chris Dobey
 James Wilson
 Nathan Derry
 Darren Webster

BDO Qualifying Tournaments

BDO ranking qualifiers
The remaining four BDO representatives were the top four non-qualified players from the BDO Invitational rankings on 30 September.

 Scott Mitchell
 Danny Noppert
 Jamie Hughes
 Martin Adams

Pools

Draw

Group stage
All group matches are best of nine legs  From each group the numbers one and two after three games qualify for the knock-out stage, the numbers three and four are eliminated
NB in Brackets: Number = Seeds; BDO = BDO Darts player; Q = Qualifier
NB: P = Played; W = Won; L = Lost; LF = Legs for; LA = Legs against; +/− = Plus/minus record, in relation to legs; Average = 3-dart average; Pts = Points; Status = Qualified to knockout stage

Group A 

12 November

13 November

14 November

Group B 

12 November

13 November

15 November

Nine dart shootout
With Robert Thornton and Dimitri Van den Bergh finishing level on points and leg difference, a nine-dart shootout between the two took place to see who would play Michael van Gerwen in the second round. The match took place after the conclusion of Tuesday's group matches, and was the first time since the 2013 Grand Slam of Darts that a nine-dart shootout was required. Van den Bergh threw first.

Group C 

12 November

13 November

15 November

Group D 

12 November

13 November

14 November

Group E 

12 November

13 November

14 November

Group F 

12 November

13 November

15 November

Group G 

12 November

13 November

15 November

Group H 

12 November

13 November

14 November

Knockout stage

References

External links
PDC netzone, Schedule, results

2016
Grand Slam
Grand Slam of Darts
Grand Slam of Darts